Flashback is a compilation album of outtakes and rare songs released by Joan Jett and the Blackhearts. The album was initially released in late 1993 and was reissued in 1998 with a slightly different track listing. The 1998 version dropped five tracks from the 1993 release:  "Summertime Blues", "Louie Louie", "Star Star", "Stand Up for Yourself" and "Call Me Lightning" and replaced them with "Real Wild Child (Wild One)", a live version of "Bad Reputation" and "Right 'Til the End", which was only available on the cassette version of the 1993 release. "Call Me Lightning" and "Summertime Blues" were later added as bonus tracks on reissues of Bad Reputation and "Louie Louie" became a bonus track on the reissue of I Love Rock 'N Roll. "Star Star" was included as an unlisted "surprise" track on the 1983 cassette release of Album, but was later removed after the original cassette was pulled from some stores because of non-labelled "explicit" track lyrics. The song was restored on the CD release.

Track listings

Production
Kenny Laguna - producer on tracks 1-4, 6-8, 10-21, 23, 1 (98), 17 (98)
Ritchie Cordell – producer on tracks 2, 11, 12, 21
Joan Jett and L7 – producers on track 5
Jimmy Iovine – producer on tracks 7, 10, 19
Rick Rubin, George Drakoulias – producers on track 9
Thom Panunzio – producer on tracks 16, 17
Joan Jett – producer on tracks 18, 1 (98)
John Aiosa – producer on tracks 18, 20
Reggie Griffin, Scorpio – producers on track 20
Steve Jones, Paul Cook – producers on track 22
Tony Bruno – producer on track 1 (98)

References

Albums produced by Jimmy Iovine
Albums produced by George Drakoulias
Joan Jett compilation albums
B-side compilation albums
1993 compilation albums
Blackheart Records albums